Albert Edward Mundy (12 May 1926 – 11 December 1999) was a professional footballer who scored 111 goals from 346 appearances in the Football League playing for Portsmouth, Brighton & Hove Albion and Aldershot.

Life and career
Mundy was born in Gosport, Hampshire, in 1926, and played for hometown club Gosport Borough before moving into the Football League with Portsmouth. He made his debut in March 1951, in a goalless draw at home to Manchester United in the First Division, but failed to establish himself as a first-team regular, and joined Brighton & Hove Albion in 1953. Playing at inside or centre forward, he was Brighton's top scorer for three consecutive seasons, from 1954–55 to 1956–57. Playing for Aldershot against Hartlepools United in 1958, Mundy scored a goal after only six seconds, which was at the time the fastest goal ever recorded. After finishing his Football League career, Mundy played in the Southern League for Guildford City before returning to Gosport Borough. On 11 December 1999, Mundy died at the age of 73 in Portsmouth.

References

1926 births
1999 deaths
People from Gosport
English footballers
Association football forwards
Gosport Borough F.C. players
Portsmouth F.C. players
Brighton & Hove Albion F.C. players
Aldershot F.C. players
Guildford City F.C. players
English Football League players
Southern Football League players